The Idriss I Dam, also known as the Idriss the First Dam, is a gravity dam on the Inaouen River, a tributary of the Sebou River. It is named after Idriss I It has come under criticism since it failed to deliver irrigation to the projected number of acres and it has also denied water use to historical downstream agricultural and residential users.

Environmental issues
A number of water pollutants enter the Sebou River and its tributaries, notably including pesticides and fertilisers from agricultural runoff and untreated sewage from towns along the river. In the upper parts of the watershed within the Middle Atlas is the prehistoric range of the endangered primate Barbary macaque, which animal prehistorically had a much larger range in North Africa.

See also

 List of power stations in Morocco

References

Bibliography
 Allan M. Findlay. 1994. The Arab world
 C. Michael Hogan. 2008.  Barbary Macaque: Macaca sylvanus, GlobalTwitcher.com
 Michele L. Thieme. 2005. Freshwater ecoregions of Africa and Madagascar: a conservation assessment  431 pages

Dams completed in 1973
Energy infrastructure completed in 1978
Dams in Morocco
Hydroelectric power stations in Morocco
Gravity dams
20th-century architecture in Morocco